Max Gallo (7 January 1932 – 18 July 2017) was a French writer, historian and politician. He wrote over one hundred books.

The son of Italian immigrants (his father was of Piedmontese descent and his mother was from the region of Parma), Gallo's early career was in journalism. At the time he was a Communist (until 1956). In 1974, he joined the Socialist Party. On 26 April 2007 the Académie Française recorded his candidacy for its Seat 24, formerly held by the late Jean-François Revel. He was elected to the Académie Française on 31 May 2007.

Bibliography

 La Cinquième colonne : Et ce fut la défaite de 40 (Français) Broché – 1 septembre 1984
 Le Cortège des vainqueurs, Robert Laffont, 1972
 Un pas vers la mer, Robert Laffont, 1973
 L’Oiseau des origines, Robert Laffont, 1974, Grand prix des lectrices de Elle
 Que sont les siècles pour la mer, Robert Laffont, 1977
 Une affaire intime, Robert Laffont, 1979
 France, Grasset, 1980
 Un crime très ordinaire, Grasset, 1982
 La Demeure des puissants, Grasset, 1983
 Au nom de tous les miens, with Martin Gray, Robert Laffont, 1971
 Le Beau Rivage, Grasset, 1985
 Belle Époque, Grasset, 1986
 La Route Napoléon, Robert Laffont, 1987
 Que Passe la Justice du Roi: Vie, procès et supplice du chevalier de La Barre, Robert Laffont, 1987
 Une affaire publique, Robert Laffont, 1989 
 Le Regard des femmes, Robert Laffont, 1991
 Les Fanatiques, Fayard, 2006
 Fier d'être Français, Fayard, 2006
 Les Romains. Spartacus. La Revolte des Esclaves, Fayard, 2006
 L'Italie de Mussolini, Editions Tallandier, 1973
  Dieu le veut, XO éditions, Paris, 2015
 Napoleon
 I. : Le Chant du départ [The Song of Departure] (1769-1799), Robert Laffont, 1997
 II. : Le Soleil d'Austerlitz [The Sun of Austerlitz] (1799-1805), Robert Laffont, 1997
 III. : L'Empereur des rois [The Emperor of Kings] (1806-1812), Robert Laffont, 1997 
 IV. : L'Immortel de Sainte-Hélène [The Immortal of St Helena] (1812-1821), Robert Laffont, 1997

References 

 Jean-Louis de Rambures, "Comment travaillent les écrivains", Paris 1978 (interview with Max Gallo, in French)

External links

 L'Académie française 
 Max Gallo: Seeking a Sense of France's Identity by John Vinocur, International Herald Tribune

1932 births
2017 deaths
People from Nice
20th-century French historians
French communists
French socialists
French Marxists
French people of Italian descent
People of Piedmontese descent
People of Emilian descent
French historical fiction writers
Marxist historians
Government spokespersons of France
Members of the Académie Française
French male non-fiction writers
Commandeurs of the Légion d'honneur
Grand Officers of the Ordre national du Mérite
Neurological disease deaths in France
Deaths from Parkinson's disease